António Isaac Monteiro is the former foreign minister of Guinea-Bissau. He was in that position from 9 November 2005 to 17 April 2007, in the government of Prime Minister Aristides Gomes. He was previously the Minister of Development.

References

Year of birth missing (living people)
Living people
Bissau-Guinean diplomats
Foreign Ministers of Guinea-Bissau
Agriculture ministers of Guinea-Bissau
Government ministers of Guinea-Bissau